Mark L. Attanasio (born September 29, 1957) is an American businessman from The Bronx who is the principal owner of the Milwaukee Brewers. In September 2004, he reached a deal, on behalf of an investment group, to purchase the Brewers from the family of Major League Baseball (MLB) commissioner Bud Selig for an estimated US$223 million. The deal was approved by MLB at the owners' winter meeting on January 13, 2005.

Early life and education 
Attanasio was born in The Bronx, New York and grew up in Tenafly, New Jersey, where he attended high school. He graduated from Brown University with a B.A. in 1979 and received his J.D. from Columbia Law School in 1982.

Career

Finance 
He co-founded the Los Angeles investment firm Crescent Capital Group in 1991, which was later bought by Trust Company of the West in 1995. In 2001, Attanasio joined the board of directors at the telecommunications firm Global Crossing, which filed for bankruptcy in January 2002. He resigned his position on the board shortly thereafter.

He is a founder and senior executive with the alternative investment firm Crescent Capital Group.

Milwaukee Brewers 
In September 2004, the Milwaukee Brewers and the Selig family announced that they had accepted Attanasio's bid to buy the team.

Other work 
Along with Brewers assistant general manager Gord Ash and former Brewers pitcher Ben Sheets, Attanasio is also a part-owner of the American Hockey League's Milwaukee Admirals.

He was a major sponsor of the widely acclaimed Andy Warhol exhibition at the Milwaukee Art Museum.

In August 2022, it was announced that Attanasio would become a director of Norwich City Football Club.|url=https://www.canaries.co.uk/content/club-issue-notice-of-general-meeting-to-shareholders |title=Club issue notice of general meeting to shareholders |publisher=Norwich City |access-date=August 19, 2022}}</ref> It was reported that he would be purchasing an 18% stake in the club from Michael Foulger.

Personal 
Mark is the brother of television writer Paul Attanasio. He is married to Deborah (née Kaplan) and has two sons, Dan and Mike. His eldest son Dan and his rock band, Pan Am, performed at Summerfest 2008 in Milwaukee, Wisconsin.

See also

List of Major League Baseball principal owners

References

Major League Baseball executives
Private equity and venture capital investors
American people of Italian descent
Brown University alumni
Milwaukee Brewers owners
People from Tenafly, New Jersey
Businesspeople from Los Angeles
People from the Bronx
Living people
1957 births
Columbia Law School alumni
Drexel Burnham Lambert